VEB Arena, known as Arena CSKA due to UEFA sponsorship regulations, is a multi-use stadium in Khodynka Field, Moscow, Russia, that was completed in 2016. It is used mostly for football matches and host the home matches of PFC CSKA Moscow and occasionally the Russian national team.

The stadium is located near the Khodynka Field in the Park of Birch Grove.

History
The construction process started in 2007 but had been halted several times, with the longest pause lasting 16 months (between 2009 and 2011).

The VEB Arena has a capacity around 30,000 people. An integral part of the stadium is a skyscraper designed to resemble the UEFA Cup, the first European trophy won by a Russian club, with CSKA beating Sporting CP in 2005. 

The first match at the new stadium was supposed to be the 2016 Russian Super Cup between CSKA and Zenit Saint Petersburg on 23 July 2016, but due to the stadium's unpreparedness the game was moved to RZD Arena. The actual first match was played on 4 September 2016, a closed friendly match between CSKA and Torpedo Moscow), in which CSKA won 3–0. The first official match at the stadium was held six days later against Terek Grozny; CSKA also won 3–0. Lacina Traoré scored the first official goal in the new arena.

On 27 September 2016, the stadium held its first European match; in the Champions League against the English club Tottenham Hotspur, in which CSKA lost 0–1. On 30 April 2017, CSKA lost 1–2 to Spartak Moscow. This was the first league defeat for CSKA in this stadium. On 9 June 2017, the Russian national team played at the stadium for the first time.

On 28 February 2017, CSKA Moscow announced that they had sold the naming rights to the stadium to Russian bank VEB, with the stadium becoming the VEB Arena. 

Exactly a year after its first European match at the stadium, CSKA played in a UEFA Champions League match against another English team. Manchester United defeated CSKA 4–1 as the match broke the attendance record with 29,073 spectators.

Russian fixtures

Concerts
Park Live 5 festival took place at the stadium, System Of A Down and Three Days Grace performed in front of more than 20,000 people.

See also
 Grigory Fedotov Stadium, previous stadium
 Light-Athletic Football Complex CSKA, training field with artificial turf located nearby

References

External links

Official site
Construction progress updates at StadiumDB.com
Design renderings at StadiumDB.com
(ru) Stadium information

PFC CSKA Moscow
Football venues in Russia
Sports venues in Moscow
Sports venues completed in 2016
2016 establishments in Russia
CSKA Moscow